Higgins Lake is an unincorporated community in Roscommon County in the U.S. state of Michigan.  The community is located within Lyon Township.  As an unincorporated community, Higgins Lake has no legally defined boundaries or population statistics of its own.  Higgins Lake has its own post office with the 48627 ZIP Code.

Geography
Higgins Lake is located along the western shores of Higgins Lake.  The community is near U.S. Route 127 to the west, and Interstate 75 is to the east on the opposite side of the lake.  Nearby parks include North Higgins Lake State Park to the north and South Higgins Lake State Park to the south.

The community is served by Roscommon Area Public Schools.

History
The area received its first post office in 1902 under the name Higgins Lake, although it was a summer-only post office that only existed briefly from June 17 to August 30, 1902.  A permanent Higgins Lake post office was opened under the same name on May 3, 1909.  This post office was discontinued soon after on March 31, 1910 but reestablished under the name Lyon Manor on August 12, 1910.  The name Lyon Manor was used until January 1, 1960 when the name was changed back to Higgins Lake.  The post office remains in operation and is located at 6311 West Higgins Lake Drive.

The post office currently uses the 48627 ZIP Code and is primarily used for post office box services.  The ZIP Code delivery serves a very small area encompassing the neighborhood immediately surrounding the post office.  The majority of the Higgins Lake area is served separately by the Roscommon 48653 ZIP Code.

References

Unincorporated communities in Roscommon County, Michigan
Unincorporated communities in Michigan